Gara Djebilet Airport is a public use airport located near Âouinet Bel Egrâ, Tindouf Province, Algeria.

References

External links 
 
 Google Maps - Gara Djebilet

Airports in Algeria
Buildings and structures in Tiaret Province